Topaklı is a village in Tarsus district of Mersin Province, Turkey. It is situated in the Taurus Mountains. The population of village was 420 as of 2011. There are some Roman ruins around the village, but they are not officially registered. There is a marble quarry to the west of the village.

References

Villages in Tarsus District